Justin Jose (born 1980) is an Indian Sound Engineer and Sound Mixer. He has worked in Hindi, Bengali, Tamil, Telugu, Marathi, Gujarati, Punjabi, Ladakhi, Latvian, Arab, Urdu and Malayalam films.

Early life and education

Justin Jose was born in Thrissur, Kerala. He graduated in economics from St.Thomas College, Thrissur. He then received his diploma in Audio Recording from Chetana Sound Studio, Thrissur, Kerala. He had also secured 4th grade of electronic keyboard from Trinity College of Music, London. He started his career from music industry.

Career

He moved to Mumbai in 2003 and joined QLabs as ADR Recordist under the ace sound engineer Deepan Chatterjee. In 2005 he became premix engineer for feature films and by 2008 he became independent re-recording mixer. Since then he is working as re-recording mixer for Indian Movies and also on regional language version mix of Hollywood movies totaling to more than 250 films. In 2012 he joined FutureWorks Studio, Mumbai and now he is handling Dolby Atmos surround mix for movies. He mixed Madras Cafe which is the first movie in India to be mixed in native Dolby Atmos. He won National Film Award for the Best Re-recordist for the movie Bajirao Mastani in 2015 and for Walking With The Wind  in 2017. His notable works include Baahubali, Padmaavat, Bajirao Mastani and Uri: The Surgical Strike.

Accolades

Honours & Recognitions 
 2017 - Indywood Academy Awards - Excellence Award for Sound Mixing several Bollywood films
 2015 - Archdiocese of Thrissur - Youth Excellence Award

Filmography

Footnotes

External links
 
 Justin Jose - Nettv4u
 Film Mixing and Sound design ~ Audio in films, and general mixing tips tricks, techniques

Film musicians from Kerala
1980 births
Living people
Musicians from Thrissur
Indian sound designers
Best Audiography National Film Award winners